24h01 was a Belgian biannual review of copyright journalism and reportage based in Brussels, Belgium. The first issue was published in October 2013. It was sold in Brussels and Wallonia, as well as in Paris and northern France. Halfway between a book and a magazine, it was the first Belgian mook. It was published in French twice a year. 24h01 was part of slow journalism containing long reports and in-depth investigations. Later its frequency was switched to quarterly. Catherine Joie was the editor-in-chief of the magazine.

In June 2018 24h01 ceased publication due to the financial problems. The twelfth issue was the last.

References

External links

2013 establishments in Belgium
2018 disestablishments in Belgium
Biannual magazines
Defunct magazines published in Belgium
French-language magazines
Magazines about the media
Magazines established in 2013
Magazines disestablished in 2018
Magazines published in Brussels
Quarterly magazines